Robert Ssentongo, is a consultant plastic surgeon in the Uganda Ministry of Health, who serves as the deputy executive director of Kiruddu General Hospital, in Makindye Division, in southern Kampala, the capital and largest city of Uganda. He was appointed to that position on 9 August 2018.

Background
Ssentongo was born in the Buganda Region of Uganda. He attended Bishop’s Primary School Mukono West for his elementary schooling. He transferred to Bishop Senior School Mukono for his secondary education.

He was admitted to Makerere University Medical School, graduating  with a Bachelor of Medicine and Bachelor of Surgery (MBChB). He went on to obtain, from the same medical school, a Master of Medicine (MMed) degree in Surgery. Later, between 2001 and 2003, he spent two continuous years attending a residency in plastic surgery at the Manipal Academy of Higher Education, in Bangalore, India.

Career
For at least 15 years, since 2003, Dr. Ssentongo has worked as a plastic surgeon at Mulago National Referral Hospital, rising to the rank of Senior Consultant, by 2015. In that capacity, he served as the lead consultant plastic surgeon at the hospital’s burns unit.

He has concurrently worked with the international non-profit, SmileTrain. He also maintains privileges at Nakasero Hospital, a private hospital, as the sole plastic surgeon on staff, as of August 2018.

In August 2018, the Uganda Ministry of Health, appointed Dr. Robert Ssentongo as the deputy executive director of Kiruddu General Hospital. He will deputize Dr. Charles Kabugo, a senior consultant physician.

See also
Charles Kabugo
John Omagino
Jackson Orem

References

External links
 Website of SmileTrain International

Living people
Year of birth missing (living people)
Ganda people
Makerere University alumni
Manipal Academy of Higher Education alumni
People from Central Region, Uganda